The Village Headmaster (later renamed The New Village Headmaster) is a Nigerian television drama series created by Olusegun Olusola and produced by Dejumo Lewis.
Originally a radio drama series, the programme was Nigeria’s longest-running television soap opera showed on the NTA from 1968 to 1988,
and starred Ted Muroko as the original headmaster. The television series was developed by Nigerian Broadcasting Corporation, and is considered one of the early successes of television drama in the country.

In 2021, a new revival of the show was announced, with Chris Iheuwa in the lead role of the headmaster. A number of actors from the earlier series are also returning.

Plot 
The Village Headmaster was set in the fictitious Yoruba village of Oja, with plot lines dealing with social problems and effect of government policies in Oja. The television series was produced after Nigeria gained independence, and was the first major television drama with an ensemble cast from different ethnic groups. Nigerian Pidgin was mixed with standard English and Yoruba as the Oja residents' language of choice, with most scenes occurring in the Oloja of Oja's palace, the headmaster's school, and Amebo's palm wine shack.

Cast
Ted Mukoro as Headmaster #1, an old-fashioned school headmaster
Femi Robinson as Headmaster #2 (replaced Mukoro) 
Justus Esiri  as Headmaster #3 (replaced Robinson)
Dejumo Lewis as Kabiyesi, Oja's traditional ruler
Clara Olushola as headmaster's wife (Clara Fagade) 
Albert Egbe as Lawyer Odunuga
 Ibidun Allison as Amebo, village gossip
Jab Adu as Bassey Okon, supplies store owner 
Funso Adeolu as Senior Chief
Joe Layode - Teacher Garuba 
Charles Awurum
 Albert Kosemasi as Gorimapa

Production
The drama was produced in 1958 and aired on radio for six years before its format transitioned into a television series on NBC TV Lagos (later NTA). A full series began in 1968 with an initial order of 13 episodes and ran until 1988. The original recordings are not known to have survived. The 1964 master-script by Segun Olusola was published by Ariya Productions in 1977 with a cover drawing by cartoonist Josy Ajiboye.

2021 Revival
In a 2013 interview with the Nigerian Tribune, Tunde Oloyede, who produced 364 episodes of the series stated: "Before the Ambassador (Olusola) died, we had been working on bringing back The Village Headmaster in three possible formats. On film, on stage, and back to television."

In 2021, three decades after the short-lived 1991 revival, a new series of The Village Headmaster was announced. Filming had commenced in 2020, and trailers were released on the NTA and YouTube. The revamped series is a collaboration with the NTA and Wale Adenuga Productions, and is expected to air in April 2021. As majority of the previous cast are either deceased or retired, most roles have been recast, notably with Chris Iheuwa who is the fourth actor in the lead role. Demujo Lewis reprises his role as the village's chief, as do Ibidun Allison (Amebo), Dele Osawe (Teacher Fadele), Dan Imoudu (Dagbolu), and Melville Obriango (Teacher Oghene). New actors include veterans Rachel Oniga (Iyalode) and Jide Kosoko (Eleyinmi), and Monica Friday (Tega Abaga).

Popular culture
The Village Headmaster is responsible for coining several terms now part of Nigerian culture. "Amebo" is used to refer to rumourmongers; in 2019, actress Ibidun Allison appeared as her Village Headmaster character Amebo in an advertising campaign for telecommunications company Globacom. The term "Gorimapa", after Kabiyesi's servant, is a common nickname for follicly-challenged men, and "Okoro" is used to describe Igbo stereotypes.

References

Nigerian drama television series
1968 establishments in Nigeria
1960s Nigerian television series
1970s Nigerian television series
1980s Nigerian television series
Television shows set in Nigeria
Nigerian Television Authority original programming